is a Japanese light novel illustrator. He is notable for the illustration for the series Zero no Tsukaima. He illustrates insert images for many novels.

After university graduation he was employed as illustrator by the visual novel publisher Visual Art's using the pseudonym Sawagani (サワガニ, Japanese Freshwater Crab). As side job he made illustrations for light novels which is against the company policy. The similarity of "both peoples" designs, were however noticed and later revealed by Tōya Okano (scenario assistant for Visual Art's' Clannad) in a Dengeki G's Magazine interview article presenting Visual Art's brand Mana’s game Angel Magister.

Works
Novels and other works he contributed his illustrations to include:
Hayate the Combat Butler light novel #2
Zero no Tsukaima
Zero no Tsukaima Gaiden: Tabatha no Bōken
Kaze no Kishihime
Shinkyoku Sōkai Polyphonica Marble
Shinkyoku Sōkai Polyphonica Blue Series
Scramble Heart as Sawagani
In Another World With My Smartphone
Angel Magister

References

External links
 Eiji Usatsuka's personal website 
 

Japanese illustrators
Living people
People from Osaka Prefecture
Year of birth missing (living people)